A birthstone is a gemstone that represents a person's period of birth, which is usually the month or zodiac sign. Birthstones are often worn as jewelry or as a pendant necklace.

History of birthstones

Western custom
The first-century historian Josephus believed there was a connection between the twelve stones in Aaron's breastplate (signifying the tribes of Israel, as described in the Book of Exodus), the twelve months of the year, and the twelve signs of the zodiac. Translations and interpretations of the passage in Exodus regarding the breastplate have varied widely, with Josephus himself giving two different lists for the twelve stones. George Frederick Kunz argues that Josephus saw the breastplate of the Second Temple, not the one described in Exodus. St. Jerome, referencing Josephus, said the Foundation Stones of the New Jerusalem (Revelation 21:19–20) would be appropriate for Christians.

In the eighth and ninth centuries, religious treatises associating a particular stone with an apostle were written so that "their name would be inscribed on the Foundation Stones, and his virtue." Practice became to keep twelve stones and wear one a month. The custom of wearing a single birthstone is only a few centuries old, though modern authorities differ on dates. Kunz places the custom in eighteenth-century Poland, while the Gemological Institute of America starts it in Germany in the 1560s.

Modern lists of birthstones have little to do with either the breastplate or the Foundation Stones of Christianity. Tastes, customs and confusing translations have distanced them from their historical origins, with one author calling the 1912 Kansas list (see below) "nothing but a piece of unfounded salesmanship."

Some poems match each month of the Gregorian calendar with a birthstone. These are traditional stones of English-speaking societies. Tiffany & Co. published these poems "of unknown author" for the first time in a pamphlet in 1870.

Modern birthstones
In 1912, in an effort to standardize birthstones, the (American) National Association of Jewelers (now called Jewelers of America) met in Kansas and officially adopted a list. The Jewelry Industry Council of America updated the list in 1952 by adding Alexandrite for June, citrine for November and pink tourmaline for October. They also replaced December's lapis with zircon and switched the primary/alternative gems for March. The American Gem Trade Association added tanzanite as a December birthstone in 2002. In 2016, the American Gem Trade Association and Jewelers of America added spinel as an additional birthstone for August. Britain's National Association of Goldsmiths created its own standardized list of birthstones in 1937. In 2021, Japanese industry associations added ten new types of birthstones.

Eastern traditions
Eastern culture recognizes a similar range of gemstones associated with birth, though rather than associating a gem with a birth month, gemstones are associated with celestial bodies, and astrology is employed to determine the gemstones most closely associated with and beneficial to a particular individual. For example, in Hinduism, there are nine gemstones associated with the Navagraha (celestial forces including the planets, the sun, and the moon), known in Sanskrit as Navaratna (nine gems). At birth, an astrological chart is calculated, and certain stones are recommended to be worn on the body to supposedly ward off potential problems based on the place of these forces in the sky at the exact place and time of birth.

Birthstones by time frame

Zodiacal

Tropical zodiac

Birthday (day of the week) stones
While the term "birthday stone" is sometimes used as a synonym for a birthstone, each day of the week is also assigned a unique gemstone, and these assignments are distinct from the monthly assignments.

Gallery

See also
 Navaratna
 Birth flowers

References

External links
 Jewelers of America leaflet
 The Curious Lore of Precious Stones, G.F. Kunz – full text online version
 Gems and Gem Minerals, Oliver Cummings Farrington – full text online version

Birthdays
Gemstones in culture